The sixth and final season of The Hills, an American reality television series, consists of 12 episodes and was broadcast on MTV. It aired from April 27, 2010, until July 13, 2010. The season was filmed primarily in Los Angeles, California, with additional footage in Crested Butte, Colorado; Miami, Florida; and Costa Rica, between December 2009 and July 2010. Its executive producer was Liz Gateley. This was the only season not to feature the series' original lead Lauren Conrad in any capacity. Fans and critics widely declared it to be the worst season of the series, as the "reality" portion of its reality-TV genre became strained and the scripted stories were seen as increasingly ridiculous, along with the general unhappiness with Kristin Cavallari as the show's "lead character" instead of Lauren.

The Hills focuses on the lives of Kristin Cavallari, Audrina Patridge, Lo Bosworth, Heidi Montag, and Stephanie Pratt. After receiving widespread criticism after having ten cosmetic surgery procedures in one day, Montag unveils the results to her family. After their underwhelming responses, she and her husband Spencer Pratt begin to alienate their family and friends. Meanwhile, Cavallari has become friends with Audrina  after feuding with her during the prior season, and resumes a flirtatious relationship with her best friend and ex-boyfriend, Brody Jenner. Audrina finds herself conflicted with her relationship with her on-again/off-again boyfriend Justin Brescia, while Bosworth and the female Pratt are depicted as mutual friends of all.

The series finale garnered media attention after it depicted the final scene being filmed in a studio backlot, responding to longtime speculation that the series was scripted. Upon the conclusion of their month-long morning marathon of The Hills, titled "RetroMTV Brunch", MTV aired an alternate ending to the series on August 9, 2013. The scene replaced the original backlot clip with footage of Jenner and Conrad talking in his apartment.

Synopsis
Kristin and Audrina have revealed to have become friends according to the girls. She also comes to terms with her fading summer romance with Justin. However, after she left the girls abandoned in Miami, rumors about her wild partying and possible drug abuse surface. Meanwhile, Heidi makes a trip to Colorado to show her family the results of her ten plastic surgery procedures. Her entire family disapproves of her surgery, and after returning to Los Angeles, she and Spencer start to alienate their friends and family.

Audrina starts dating her old friend, Ryan Cabrera, when Justin shows interest in being a part of her life once again. Brody meets McKaela Line, and the two begin to date and upset Kristin with their public affection towards each other.  Later, McKaela brings her friend Allie Lutz around with her, much to Kristin's disapproval, as the two despise each other. Stephanie starts dating again after her DUI. Lo must make a major decision in her relationship with her boyfriend, Scott.

Cast

Speidi's absence
The fourth episode of the season, "This Is Goodbye", which aired on May 18, 2010, marked the final appearance of Heidi Montag and Spencer Pratt from The Hills. Pratt was kicked off the show after threatening to kill a producer of the series. Originally, he was supposed to return after anger management and a six-week hiatus from the series, but his behavior later worsened causing him to be completely removed from the cast. Heidi filed and then dropped false charges against The Hills creator Adam Divello claiming sexual harassment. Due to Montag's absence, Stephanie Pratt was bumped up from a recurring role to the fifth main cast member.

Episodes

Aftershow
At the beginning of the season, there was much speculation that original cast member Lauren Conrad (who left the series after Season 5, Part 1) would make an appearance for the last season. Despite the crew's effort to persuade her to appear, Conrad confirmed that she would not be appearing on the series, saying, "I really liked how I got to leave the show. I felt like it was on a positive note and I feel like they wrapped up my storyline."

However, MTV later announced that the entire The Hills cast from the beginning would reunite on a one-hour live special, The Hills Live: A Hollywood Ending. The event followed the series' finale and its spin-off show The Citys series finale. Despite being advertised that the whole cast would appear on the special, Heidi Montag did not appear on the special.

References

External links
The Hills on MTV
The Hills on MTV Canada

6
2010 American television seasons